Martin Monrad (born 1977) is a male table tennis player from Denmark. From 2005 he won some medals in team events in the Table Tennis European Championships.

References

1977 births
Danish male table tennis players
Living people
21st-century Danish people